Wild Flag is the sole studio album by American indie rock band Wild Flag. It was released on September 13, 2011 on Merge Records in America and Wichita Recordings in England.

Composition
Musically, Wild Flag takes on "endlessly catchy" pop-punk and "determined" pop rock while also showing the quartet's psych-rock side. 

It is also seen as a fusion of 1970s punk with "careful" hints of new wave music. Rebecca Cole's keys tap into the latter genre and its "nervy urgency", as well as the proto-punk of the 1972 compilation Nuggets.

Critical reception

Wild Flag received a very positive reception from critics, which is reflected by its normalized rating of 83 out of 100 based on 37 reviews aggregated by online review aggregator Metacritic. Pitchfork placed the album at number 49 on its list of the "Top 50 albums of 2011".

Track listing
"Romance" – 3:52
"Something Came Over Me" – 4:03
"Boom" – 2:45
"Glass Tambourine" – 5:29
"Endless Talk" – 3:00
"Short Version" – 3:34
"Electric Band" – 3:33
"Future Crimes" – 2:44
"Racehorse" – 6:40
"Black Tiles" – 4:30
iTunes Store bonus track
"Oh Yeah" – 2:32

Personnel
Carrie Brownstein – guitar, vocals
Rebecca Cole – keyboards, piano, vocals
Mary Timony – guitar, vocals
Janet Weiss – drums, vocals

References

External links
Wild Flag on Merge Records

2011 debut albums
Merge Records albums
Wichita Recordings albums
Wild Flag albums